Dahyabhai Shastri is an Indian scholar of Sanskrit and the founder of Brahmarshi Sanskrit Mahavidyalaya, Nadiad. He is also a former president of the Gujarat state unit of the Vishwa Hindu Parishad. Born in Vasai Dabhla, a small village in Mehsana district of Gujarat and did his studies in Sanskrit in Ahmedabad and Varanasi, Shastri chairs the Veda Centre, Pardi. He is known for contributions in interpreting Sanskrit grammar and literature and is a recipient of Gujarat State Award. The Government of India awarded him the fourth highest civilian honour of the Padma Shri, in 2016, for his contributions to Literature and education.

See also 
 Sanskrit grammar

References

External links 
 

Recipients of the Padma Shri in literature & education
Year of birth missing (living people)
People from Mehsana district
Gujarati people
20th-century Indian educators
Indian Sanskrit scholars
Sanskrit grammarians
Scholars from Gujarat
Living people